"Mainstreet" is a song written and recorded by Bob Seger & The Silver Bullet Band. It was released in April 1977 as the second single from the album Night Moves. The song peaked at number 24 on the U.S. Billboard Hot 100 and has become a staple of classic rock radio; it also reached number one on the Canadian Singles Chart.

Lyrics and music
Seger has stated that the street he was singing about is Ann Street, just off Main Street in Ann Arbor, Michigan, where he grew up. There was a pool hall there where they had girls dancing in the window and R&B bands playing on the weekends.  He said, "Again, that's going back to the 'Night Moves' situation where I was writing about my high school years in Ann Arbor and what it was like — the discovery, the total naivete and fresh–faced openness that I went through. It was sort of an entire awakening of my life; before that I was kind of a quiet, lonesome kid."

Seger later expanded on the origins of the song:

Ultimate Classic Rock critic Jed Gottlieb cites "Mainstreet" as an example of Seger's love for "beautiful losers."  He notes that Seger sings about a "dancer in a downtown dive" rather than the waitresses, prom queens or college girls who would be the subject of other singers' songs.  And he notes that unlike in other singers' songs, the singer doesn't try to save or run away with the girl, but is content to just watch her walk by.

Billboard felt that the imagery used  by the singer to remember his love for the bar dancer was reminiscent of Van Morrison.  Billboard also found the organ counterpoint to be "clever."  Cash Box compared it to "Night Moves" saying that "this haunting ballad hits home with the same emotive chording, expressive vocalization and dramatic close." Record World said that it focuses on "Seger's mellower, more introspective side."

Classic Rock History critic Janey Roberts rated it as Seger's 7th best song, calling it "an ode to the romantic backstreets of hope and despair found on Springsteen’s classic 1975 work [Born to Run]."

It is in the key of D. During live performances the iconic Pete Carr guitar intro was replaced with a sax intro.

Personnel
Credits are adapted from the liner notes of Seger's 1994 Greatest Hits compilation.
Bob Seger – lead vocals

Muscle Shoals Rhythm Section
Barry Beckett – keyboards
Pete Carr – lead guitar, acoustic guitar
Roger Hawkins – drums, percussion
David Hood – bass
Jimmy Johnson – rhythm guitar

Reception
VH1's Mike McPadden selected "Mainstreet" as one of Seger's 10 most essential songs, describing it as "sad, sweet, soulful, and even spooky" for how it evokes the emotions of a hopeful but frustrated young man watching a woman he is too scared to approach.  McPadden particularly praises the keyboard playing for how it complements the song's "melancholy" mood. Classic Rock History contributor Janey Roberts also selected "Mainstreet" as one of Seger's top 10 songs, particularly praising the opening guitar line and describing the song as an "ode to the romantic backstreets of hope and despair" similar to those on Bruce Springsteen's Born to Run album.

Chart performance

Weekly charts

Year-end charts

Certifications

References

External links
 

1977 singles
Songs written by Bob Seger
1976 songs
Capitol Records singles
Song recordings produced by Bob Seger
RPM Top Singles number-one singles
Rock ballads
Bob Seger songs